Farringdon is a village in the East Hampshire district of Hampshire in England.  The village is 2.8 miles (4.5 km) south of Alton, on the A32 road, close to a source of the River Wey.

The village has two parts, the larger being Upper Farringdon. Lower Farringdon is on the Alton to Gosport road, the A32. The 2001 census predicted a population for Farringdon Parish by 2006 of 495 increasing to 664 at the 2011 Census .

The northern of the River Wey's two sources rises in countryside close to Farringdon (Grid Reference: SU707394).

History
Archaeological finds in the village include a Bronze Age beaker (found in September 1938) with a cruciform design on the base, of which only two examples are known; and a Roman coin, a Sestertius of Trajan (found in 1936). Both are now in Alton Museum. Farringdon was listed in the Domesday Book as Ferendone; the word means fern-covered hill. The village has a Norman church and a number of pre-18th Century houses.

Lewis Cage, as lord of the manor, led the request for the enclosure of the commons and common fields in 1748. The evidence that survives is in two parts: the first found formal map of a local ridge enclosure, worn around the edges with damp marks, but listing all the recipients and placing their allotments; and five handwritten early agreement drafts with multiple gaps, insertions, crossings out, corrections and spelling inconsistences in proper nouns that have been badly treated with tears and staining. There were five arbitrators appointed to ‘avoid difficulties and disputes' followed by familiar names from other local enclosures: William Knight and Thomas Eames, yeoman, both Chawton, 1740; and Richard Wake, senior and junior, and John and William Finden, all Soldridge, 1735.

The Farringdon enclosure is remarkable in two ways. First, it is the only enclosure agreement along the Four Marks ridge not to have the approval of a parliamentary act. Considering the desperation in the previous fifty years to secure acts for Ropley, Soldridge and Chawton, this needs
explaining. Thoughts go back to the ragtag collection of scruffy copies at the Hampshire Record Office that hold the written form of the agreement, without ‘hands’, signatures, marks or seals. Perhaps there is no final legal document? Then, there is evidence of the enclosure map, carefully drawn detailed and complete in every way. There could be no doubt about what was agreed. Could it be the fast-moving landowners, with all their experience of previous enclosures, quickly made the assessors’ decisions a reality and negated a signed document?

Supporting this view is the second remarkable aspect of the Farringdon enclosure: the 427 acres were divided between fifty-three entities, almost all individuals. Five families took almost 60 per cent of the land: John and William Finden, 17 per cent; William Knight, 12; John Tribe, 10; two Richard Wakes, father and son, 10; and Lewis Cage, under 9. The only other significant holdings were by Mary Windybank, nearly 6 per cent; Elizabeth with Thomas Fielder, just over 5 per cent; and John Langrish, Robert Rogers, and John with Jane and James Fry, each above 3 per cent. A paltry 0.1 per cent, less than half an acre, was set aside for the poor of Farnham (not Alton). The remaining thirty-seven parties all received less than 2 per cent of the land; twenty of them less, or much less, than two acres. Here are the independent commoners so significantly missing from the Chawton enclosure. It was the reason that the Farringdon agreement was relatively secure. No cottager, it seems, was thrown from their encroachment or rented plot. The lord, Lewis Cage, did not have the power, or perhaps wish, of his neighbour, Thomas Knight. The poor in Farringdon had a voice: not a voice which built a future, but one which at least maintained their past and a modicum of independence from deferential labour.

Notable people and buildings
Farringdon has close associations with two of Britain's most celebrated figures, the novelist Jane Austen (1775-1817) and the naturalist Gilbert White (1720-1793). Austen would come from her home in nearby Chawton, a little over a mile to the north, to visit friends and acquaintances in Farringdon. From 1761 to 1785 White was curate of Farringdon's village church of All Saints, and his pulpit still survives. One of the parish registers contains entries in his handwriting. Gilbert White's house, now a museum, is a little over three miles west of Farringdon. All Saints has Norman and 12th/13th century origins and retains good stained windows. The churchyard contains yew trees reputed to be of great antiquity; the hollow nature of the trees makes ring-counting dating impossible, but estimates have suggested that the trees may be as much as 2,000 years old. 

A Farringdon landmark is Massey's Folly, an imposing but eccentric building with towers and battlements built by another curate of Farringdon, Rev. T.H. Massey. Its intended purpose during its construction was obscure, but since a few years after the Reverend's death in 1919 it has served as a school and village hall and featured in the 2006 BBC TV programme, Restoration Village.  Massey's Folly is in the process of  being sold for development as residential units. The Rev Massey also built a vicarage in the village (now a private house).

The very first Cadbury Milk Tray advert was filmed in Lower Farringdon, by Woodside Road, along the old Meon Valley Railway.

The famous Beagley brothers (Thomas, Henry and John), who all represented Hampshire at cricket (Thomas even played for England), all came from the village. Their roots in the Alton area predate the Elizabethan era.

Transport
Farringdon's closest railway station is at Alton, 2.8 miles (4.5 km) north of the village. The A32 passing through Lower Farringdon was formerly a major route, but the old Alton-Gosport road is passed to the west and east by two major trunk routes, the M3 and the A3(M). As  result, traffic density through Farringdon is relatively light. A 30 mph limit is in force.

Further reading
Heal, Chris, Ropley's Legacy, The ridge enclosures, 1709 to 1850: Chawton, Farringdon, Medstead, Newton Valence and Ropley and the birth of Four Marks (Chattaway & Spottiswood, 2021)

Montgomery, Roy, The village of Farringdon and parish of All Saints (Hampshire Genealogical Society, No 15)

Munby, Julian, edited, Domesday Book, 4, Hampshire (1086; Phillimore, Chichester 1982)

References

External links

 Massey's Folly
 BBC Restoration Village

Census:
 

Villages in Hampshire